Herbert Lee Buchanan III (born July 29, 1949 in Waynesville, North Carolina) was United States Assistant Secretary of the Navy (Research, Development and Acquisitions) from 1998 to 2001.

Biography

H. Lee Buchanan III was raised in Nashville, TN and graduated from the Montgomery Bell Academy in 1967. He was educated at Vanderbilt University (B.S. in Electrical Engineering, 1971; M.S. in Electrical Engineering, 1972) and the University of California, Berkeley (Ph.D. in applied physics, 1985).

Buchanan joined the United States Navy in 1971, and served as a naval flight officer from 1971 to 1978.  He left the Navy in 1978, but remained a captain in the United States Navy Reserve until 2001.  In 1979, he became senior physicist at the Lawrence Livermore National Laboratory.  He left the Lawrence Livermore National Laboratory in 1982, joining Titan Corp. as Division Manager for Applied Science.  He joined the Advanced Research Projects Agency (later renamed the Defense Advanced Research Projects Agency) in 1985, culminating in his appointment as its deputy director in March 1996.

On September 9, 1998, President of the United States Bill Clinton nominated Buchanan as Assistant Secretary of the Navy (Research, Development and Acquisitions) and Buchanan subsequently held this office from October 2, 1998 until January 20, 2001.

Upon leaving office, Buchanan joined Paladin Capital Group. He was a board member of crowdsourcing company OmniCompete from 2011 until its acquisition by Innocentive in January 2012.

References

 Press Release Announcing Buchanan's appointment as Assistant Secretary of the Navy (Research, Development and Acquisitions)
 Business Week Profile

1949 births
Living people
People from Waynesville, North Carolina
People from Nashville, Tennessee
Vanderbilt University alumni
American electrical engineers
United States Naval Flight Officers
UC Berkeley College of Engineering alumni
United States Navy reservists
United States Navy captains
United States Assistant Secretaries of the Navy